Emy is a Sri Lankan television series broadcast on Independent Television Network, directed by Sanjaya Nirmal and produced by Malathi Wijayasinghe. The teledrama was shot in 2017 and released in 2019.

Plot
Emy is a Sri Lankan born girl lived in UK is coming back to her mother country to visit her grandmother owing to a number of issues undergone inside her family. She who is coming from a broken family has been diagnosed with a fatal disease which is only known by her mother still residing in UK. She has several months left to live ; but her grandmother is not aware of the fact. Emy’s grandmother, Daisy who is a retired psychiatrist gives shade to five children in her residence who have extraordinary capabilities. Five children named Kavindu, Sithija, Gagani, Timal and Pasindu grow up under the grandmother’s wings tend to be prosocial as per the instance of their grandmother. Emy’s advent makes the children frustrated and children plan to chase her away; but she gradually gets closer to them. Emy who has had a poor childhood and who has several months left to live, decides by herself to turn a new chapter in life thought her life slowly comes to an end. She who is not much concerned of her poor health condition as well as her bitter childhood experiences marches the group of five children towards the betterment of other psychologically disturbed children and adults. Emy and her friends extend their arms to those who are in need despite the obstacles rolling towards them.

Cast and Characters 

Michelle Dilhara as Emy
Hyacinth Wijeratne as Grand Mother
Maneesha Chanchala as Sara
Tillakaratne Dilshan as Cricket Player
Anuruddhika Padukkage
Nuwangi Liyanage
Samadara Ariyawansa
Raja Pathirana
Sangeeth Prabhu as Pawan

Child Artists
Yohani Hansika as Gagani
Naveen Saumya as Kavindu
Venuka Joseph as Dimal
Sharadh Chandracha as Sitige

References

External links
 
 Emy on Independent Television Network
 Michelle Dilhara

Sri Lankan drama television series
2000s Sri Lankan television series
2007 Sri Lankan television series debuts
Independent Television Network original programming